Sigurd Jebsen Grieg (22 August 1894 – 3 November 1973) was a Norwegian museologist and archeologist. He was director of the Sandvig Collections  at Maihaugen in Lillehammer. He is most associated with the excavation of 
Raknehaugen, a  prehistoric burial barrow located at Ullensaker in Akershus, Norway.

Biography
He was born in the  borough of Fana in the city of Bergen, Norway. He was the son of Bergen-based book publisher, John Grieg (1856–1905).
and Marie Justine Agnethe Jebsen (1862–1943).

He earned his Master's Degree (1923) and  PhD (1926) from  the University of Oslo. Then he was for several years been employed at the university's Antiquities Collection as an assistant and curator.  From 1924 to 1946, he was administrative manager of the university's Antiquities Collection (Universitetets Oldsaksamling) now the  Museum of Cultural History, Oslo. Grieg  conducted an extensive investigation of Raknehaugen   at Ullensaker beginning in summer 1939. Before work could continue at the site, Norway had been occupied by Nazi Germany.

His later research centered principally on the culture of the Middle Ages. In 1946, he took over as director of the Sandvig Collections (Sandvigske Samlinger) at  Maihaugen  in Lillehammer.  Grieg retired at the age limit in 1964, but continued for a few more years as a museum assistant at the university's Antiquities Collection.

Personal life
In 1920, Sigurd Grieg married Else Thiis (1898–1977. They had a son, John Egil Grieg (1928–2006)  who became an ambassador.
Sigurd Grieg was a member of the Norwegian Academy of Sciences from 1937. He was appointed a knight of the 1st class of the Order of St. Olav in 1957. Sigurd Grieg died during 1973 at Lillehammer.

Publications

References

External links
Raknehaugen - en empirisk loftsrydning

1894 births
1973 deaths
Curators from Bergen
Archaeologists from Bergen
University of Oslo alumni
Grini concentration camp survivors
20th-century archaeologists
Directors of museums in Norway
Recipients of the St. Olav's Medal
Members of the Norwegian Academy of Science and Letters